Karnataka Arebhashe Samskruthi mathu Sahitya Academy is an organization under Government of Karnataka for promotion of literature in Arebhashe language. Established on 15 December 2011 by the Government of Karnataka.  The purpose of the academy is to preserve and promote the Arebhashe language, Arebhashe literature, and Arebhashe culture. Which has a considerable population of Arebhashe speakers, a language minority in the state Karnataka and Kerala. Arebhashe is a dialect of Kannada spoken mainly by Gowda and other community in the region of Kodagu, Sullia of Dakshina Kannada in the Indian state of Karnataka as well as Bandadka, Kasaragod District in the Indian state of Kerala. The academy was formed by then Chief Minister D. V. Sadananda Gowda.

Work Structure 
The Karnataka Arebhashe Samskruthi mathu Sahitya Academy organizes workshops, seminars, cultural events, and gatherings for the Arebhashe public. It also provides research grants for research in Arebhashe language and culture; publishes books and presents the annual awards in the fields of Arebhashe literature, folk arts, yakshagana, research and novel writing.

Arebhashe Day
Karnataka Arebhashe Samskruthi mathu Sahitya Academy celebrating December 15 of every year as Arebhashe Dinacharane

Magazine 
The Academy has a library that houses a good collection of books and magazines in Arebhase. It also publishes a quarterly magazine by name Hingara.

Academy Books
Academy published 60 books till 2022. Academy big projects books are Arebhashe Paramparika Kosha, Arebhashe Dictionary, Arebhashe Vishwakosha

On-Going Projects 
To educate the young generation planed for textbooks, glossary, translation, and archival work to preserve and develop the language and culture of the Arebashe Culture. The academy is also working on a documentary collection for veteran personalities of this region, including a seminar on youth literature, a drama camp, and poetry.

See also 
 Dakshina Kannada
 Sullia
Arebhashe Dialect
 Tulu Gowda
 Karnataka ethnic groups

References 

Indic literature societies
Dravidian languages
Languages of India
Kannada language